Landsford Plantation House, also known as the Davie House, is a historic plantation house located near Richburg, Chester County, South Carolina. It was built about 1828, and is a -story, timber-framed weatherboarded vernacular residence. The house has a square plan and is two rooms deep. The main façade featured a one-story porch, resting on brick piers, and added about the turn of the 20th century. Landsford Plantation achieved local prominence as the social center of a  Piedmont cotton plantation in the mid-19th century. Of the original outbuildings, only a barn of log construction remains.

It was listed on the National Register of Historic Places in 1987.

References

Houses on the National Register of Historic Places in South Carolina
Houses completed in 1828
Houses in Chester County, South Carolina
National Register of Historic Places in Chester County, South Carolina
Plantation houses in South Carolina